National-Catholic Movement is a small Polish political party represented in the Senate of the Republic of Poland. The only current senator was elected from the Law and Justice electoral committee's ballot.

Leaders
Małgorzata Romanowicz - chairman

Senator
Jerzy Czerwiński

References

External links
Official Site

1997 establishments in Poland
Catholic political parties
Catholicism and far-right politics
Conservative parties in Poland
Far-right political parties in Poland
Nationalist parties in Poland
Polish nationalist parties
Political parties established in 1997
Political parties in Poland